The Last Exorcism is a 2010 American found footage supernatural horror film directed by Daniel Stamm. It stars Patrick Fabian, Ashley Bell, Iris Bahr, Caleb Landry Jones, and Louis Herthum.

After years of performing exorcisms, a disillusioned evangelical minister decides to participate in a documentary chronicling his last exorcism while exposing the fraud of his ministry. After receiving a letter from a farmer asking for help in driving out the devil, he meets the farmer's afflicted daughter.
The film received positive reviews from critics and was a box office success, grossing more than $67 million against a $1.8 million budget.

A sequel, The Last Exorcism Part II, was released on March 1, 2013.

Plot
Filmmakers Iris and Daniel follow Cotton Marcus, a reverend living in Baton Rouge, Louisiana, who seeks to delegitimize exorcisms. Marcus, who lost his faith after the birth of his ill son, is accustomed to performing fake exorcisms on "possessed" individuals. He accepts an exorcism request sent by farmer Louis Sweetzer, who claims his livestock are being slaughtered by his daughter Nell; Louis suspects that Nell is possessed by Satan.

Marcus arrives and claims Nell is possessed by Abalam, a powerful demon. He persuades the family that he has driven out the demon and leaves, believing he and his crew have cured her of a mental state that was misdiagnosed as possession. That night, Nell appears in Marcus's motel room, visibly unwell. Marcus takes Nell to the hospital for tests, which conclude that she is in perfect physical condition. Marcus goes to see Louis's former pastor, Joseph Manley, who informs Marcus that he has not seen Nell for three years. In the morning, Louis takes Nell home but chains her to the bed after she cuts her brother Caleb's face with a knife.

Marcus frees Nell from her restraints and later finds her trying to drown a doll while seemingly sleepwalking. When the hospital calls back to inform that Nell is pregnant, Iris accuses Louis of incest, which Marcus rejects. That night, Nell steals their camera and goes into her father's barn, where she brutally smashes a cat to death. Iris and Daniel discover her morbid paintings; in addition to the death of the cat, they depict Marcus standing before a large flame with a crucifix, Iris dismembered, and Daniel decapitated. Marcus confronts Louis about Nell's pregnancy; Louis insists that Nell is a virgin and has been impregnated by the demon. Offended at Marcus's insistence that a demon is not involved, Louis demands that the crew leave and alludes to intending to kill Nell. The crew tries to escape with Nell, who attacks Marcus before Louis threatens to shoot her. Marcus offers to attempt a second exorcism to dissuade him as Nell begs Louis to kill her.

During the exorcism, "Abalam" agrees to release Nell only if Marcus can remain silent for ten seconds. Each second, Nell breaks one of her fingers. After three, Marcus yells for Abalam to stop; Abalam asks Marcus if he wants a "blowing job". Marcus challenges that a demon would know the actual name of the sex act and concludes that Nell is not possessed, but a disturbed and ashamed girl. Nell anguishes over losing her virginity to a boy named Logan, which Louis again rejects. Marcus and the crew meet Logan, who explains that he is gay and the only contact he had with Nell was a brief conversation at Manley's house six months ago; the crew realizes Manley was lying about having not seen Nell. They return to the Sweetzer farmhouse, which they find empty and covered with numerous occult and countercultural symbols on its walls.

The group follows the sound of voices into the woods, where they see a large fire and a congregation of hooded cultists led by Manley. Louis is tied up, gagged and blindfolded while hooded figures pray around an altar, atop which Nell is bound. She gives birth to an inhuman child. Manley throws the child into the fire, which causes the fire to grow rapidly as demonic roars emanate. Marcus, his faith restored, grabs his cross and rushes towards the fire to combat the evil. Iris and Daniel flee, and Iris is subdued by members of the congregation and killed with an axe. Daniel continues to run before Caleb decapitates him and the camera falls.

Cast

Release
The film was slated to be a part of the South by Southwest Film Festival 2010. On February 12, 2010, Lionsgate purchased the rights for the US distribution and pulled the film from the festival. The release of the film was set for August 27, 2010.

The film had its world premiere at the LA Film Festival on June 24, 2010 and was here introduced by Eli Roth and Daniel Stamm. Members of the cast were also introduced on stage, Patrick Fabian, Ashley Bell, Louis Herthum, Caleb Landry Jones, Iris Bahr, and Tony Bentley. The Last Exorcism was the last screened film on August 30, 2010, on the Film4 FrightFest 2010.

Bloody Disgusting hosted the screening of the 2010 San Diego Comic-Con International and the second screening on 24 July 2010 is narrated by Eli Roth.

Poster controversy
In the UK, a poster image for the film showed a young girl, wearing a blood-spattered dress, bent over backwards below a crucifix.  This poster received 77 complaints, the complainants describing it as "offensive", "distressing", and "unsuitable for public viewing". Two people also claimed the girl in the poster seemed to have suffered a sexual assault, a complaint which was not upheld. The Advertising Standards Agency decided that the image could not be used on a publicly visible poster since that was an untargeted medium but was acceptable on the back cover of Cineworld magazine.

Viral campaign
The Last Exorcism used Chatroulette as the medium of its viral campaign involving a girl who pretends to unbutton her top seductively, then stops and turns into a monster. At the end, the URL of the film's official website is flashed on screen.

Home media
The Last Exorcism was released on DVD and Blu-ray on January 4, 2011. The Blu-ray includes the DVD of the film and a digital copy as well.

Reception

Critical reception
The Last Exorcism has received generally positive reviews from critics, garnering a 72% approval rating on review aggregator Rotten Tomatoes based on 161 reviews and an average rating of 6.17/10. The site's consensus being "It doesn't fully deliver on the chilly promise of its Blair Witch-style premise, but The Last Exorcism offers a surprising number of clever thrills." The film received a 63 out of 100 on Metacritic, indicating "generally favorable reviews". At Yahoo! Movies the film holds a B− based on twelve reviews.

Jeannette Catsoulis of The New York Times gave the film 4 out of 5 stars and wrote that the film was "An unusually restrained and genuinely eerie little movie perched at the intersection of faith, folklore and female puberty." On the other hand, Joe Neumaier of New York Daily News gave the film 1 out of 5 stars and wrote, "Some of Bell's contortionist tricks aren't nearly as frightening as the best moments in Paranormal Activity. Or, really, some of the better episodes of Scooby-Doo."

Box office
The Last Exorcism opened at #2 at the U.S. box office the weekend of August 27, 2010, behind Takers. It grossed $20,366,613 from 2,874 theaters in its first three days. The Last Exorcism had a budget of $1.8 million. The film remained in the top five, falling to number four in its second weekend. The film went on to gross $41 million domestically and $26.7 million foreign to total $67.7 million worldwide.

Awards and nominations

Sequel

On August 23, 2011, The Hollywood Reporter announced that a sequel was in the works. On April 20, 2012, an audition sheet revealed the film's full title as Beginning of the End: The Last Exorcism II. The film was directed by Ed Gass-Donnelly, with Damien Chazelle (Guy and Madeline on a Park Bench) providing the screenplay. Ashley Bell reprises her role as Nell. On January 2, 2013, the poster for the film was released, revealing the final title to be The Last Exorcism Part II. The film was also produced by Eli Roth.

References

External links
 
  
  
 
 

2010 films
2010 horror films
2010s supernatural films
American supernatural horror films
Baton Rouge, Louisiana
Camcorder films
Films about exorcism
Films set in Louisiana
Films shot in Louisiana
Films shot in New Orleans
Found footage films
American mockumentary films
StudioCanal films
Vivendi franchises
Films produced by Marc Abraham
Films produced by Eli Roth
Films scored by Nathan Barr
2010s English-language films
Films directed by Daniel Stamm
2010s American films